Play with Toys is the debut album by American group Basehead.  It was voted one of the top 50 albums of 1992 in Q magazine, and listed as number 43 in NMEs top albums of 1992.

Music and lyrics 
Writing for Rolling Stone, Kevin Powell writes that "using live drums, acoustic guitar, bass and DJ (the group samples sparingly), Play With Toys is a concept album that ties rock, funk, blues and honky-tonk to rap". This style also incorporates elements of pop, psychedelic and reggae, and was described as an alternative rap "cult favorite". David Jeffries described Play with Toys as "slacker rap". According to Michael Ivey, "There are hip-hop elements in there, but if a hardcore hip-hop fan bought it, they might be disappointed". Ivey also stated that Basehead's music "doesn't have the expected samples and sounds." The lyrical themes of Play with Toys focus on diverse subjects, including alcohol and marijuana use, depression, philosophy, politics, and relationship breakups. Francis Davis wrote that Ivey's lyrics "[subvert] both rock music and gangsta-rap conventions." The instrumentation of Play with Toys was created largely with live instruments rather than samples, which differentiates the album's sound from that of mainstream hip hop. Instruments were altered with studio techniques for effect, and Ivey altered the pitch of his voice for sketches in which he voiced the friends of the album's protagonist. Ivey's vocals mix singing and rapping.

Reception 

Rolling Stone reviewer Kevin Powell wrote that "Without being preachy, Basehead's unconventional style challenges listeners to get beyond their basic instincts and open their minds, search their souls."

Track listing

Personnel 
 Michael Ivey – guitar, vocals
 Brian Hendrix – live drums
 Bruce 'Kool Aid' Gardner – live drums on "2000 BC"
 Paul 'DJ Unique' Howard – scratches
 Bob Dewald – bass on "Play with Toys"
 Marco Delmar – feedback solo on "Play with Toys"

References 

1990 debut albums
Basehead albums